GVM may refer to:
Godawari Vidhya Mandir, a school in Itahari, Nepal
Goa Vidyaprasarak Mandal, an educational institution in India
Gautham Vasudev Menon he is an Indian film director, screenwriter and producer who works in Tamil, Telugu and Hindi cinema
Gross vehicle mass, the maximum rated mass of a vehicle including its tare mass and the mass of its load, including its cargo, driver and passengers
Generalized Verma module, an object in mathematics
may refer to several Godzilla films, including Godzilla vs. Megalon, Godzilla vs. Mechagodzilla, Godzilla vs. Mothra, or Godzilla vs. Megaguirus